The 2016 Copa Sevilla was a professional tennis tournament played on clay courts. It was the 19th edition of the tournament which was part of the 2016 ATP Challenger Tour. It took place in Seville, Spain between 5 and 10 September 2016.

Singles main-draw entrants

Seeds

 1 Rankings are as of August 29, 2016.

Other entrants
The following players received wildcards into the singles main draw:
  Pedro Martínez
  Ricardo Ojeda Lara
  Carlos Taberner
  Pablo Andújar

The following player received entry into the singles main draw with a protected ranking:
  Fabiano de Paula

The following players received entry from the qualifying draw:
  Pol Toledo Bagué
  Christopher O'Connell
  Bastián Malla
  Casper Ruud

The following player entered as a lucky loser:
  Roberto Ortega-Olmedo

Champions

Singles

 Casper Ruud def.   Taro Daniel, 6–3, 6–4.

Doubles

 Íñigo Cervantes /  Oriol Roca Batalla def.  Ariel Behar /  Enrique López Pérez, 6–2, 6–5 RET.

References

External links
Official Website

2016
2016 ATP Challenger Tour
2016 in Spanish tennis
September 2016 sports events in Spain